Terry Farrell (born December 19, 1960) is a Canadian politician, who was elected to the Nova Scotia House of Assembly in the 2013 provincial election. A member of the Nova Scotia Liberal Party, he represented the electoral district of Cumberland North until his defeat in 2017.

Electoral record

|-

|Liberal
|Terry Farrell
|align="right"| 2,944
|align="right"| 39.81
|align="right"| 
|-
 
|Progressive Conservative
|Judith Marie Giroux 
|align="right"| 2,230
|align="right"| 30.15
|align="right"| 
|-

|New Democratic Party
|Brian Skabar
|align="right"| 1,943
|align="right"| 26.27
|align="right"| 
|-

|}

References

Living people
Nova Scotia Liberal Party MLAs
People from Amherst, Nova Scotia
1960 births
21st-century Canadian politicians